Ranges Bridge is a rural locality in the Western Downs Region, Queensland, Australia. In the  Ranges Bridge had a population of 132 people.

History
The locality takes its name from the Range's Bridge, named after a local family called Range.

Ranges Bridge Provisional School opened circa 1886 and closed in June 1894. The school building was then relocated and reopened as Macalister Provisional School on 27 August 1894. On 1 January 1909 it  became Macalister State School. In 1913 it was renamed Apunyal State School. It closed circa 1935.

In the  Ranges Bridge had a population of 132 people.

References 

Western Downs Region
Localities in Queensland